Xeradipterus is an extinct genus of lungfish which existed in Australia during the Frasnian period. Of moderate size, it is believed to be a primitive member of the family Holodontidae characterized by its powerful crushing dentition with thick heels on the lower jaw tooth plates. The type and only specimen was found in the Gogo Formation by Lindsay Hatcher on an expedition to Gogo led by John A. Long on behalf of Museum Victoria in 2005.

References

Prehistoric lungfish genera
Prehistoric fish of Australia
Devonian bony fish
Fossil taxa described in 2010